Robert Shaw (born 1950, Manchester UK) is a business author and consultant on the field of marketing, particularly Marketing performance measurement and management and Database marketing.

Life and career 
Shaw received his master's degree and Ph.D. at Cambridge University, both in mathematical physics, and he also holds an MSc in Operations Research.  He worked for Andersen Consulting leading consulting projects and developing new concepts on marketing data and metrics and then in 1989 founded VBMF, his own consulting firm.  He has been consulted by many large companies – including BP, IBM, Manchester United, Nestle and Unilever and has a Brand Leadership Award from the World Brands Congress; CEO Magazine has named him “leading new-generation business guru”; the Management Consultants Association and the Chartered Institute of Marketing have both awarded him Book of the Year Author. He is currently an Honorary Professor of Marketing Metrics at Cass Business School.

Key Ideas 

Two key ideas run through most of Shaw's writing.

1.  Marketing automation: the idea that the marketing function should embrace IT to improve its efficiency and effectiveness. Shaw has tracked the uses and abuses of IT in marketing for over 20 years and defined best practices in this field.
 1988 – Database Marketing
 1988 – Survey of Marketing Software Packages
 1991 – Computer-Aided Marketing and Selling
 1994 – How to Transform Marketing Through IT
 2009 – Rethinking the Chain – Make marketing leaner, faster and better

2.  Marketing performance measurement and management. Shaw identified the need for marketing to become more measurable and accountable and his researches continue to define best practice in this field.
 1997 – Marketing Accountability
 1998 – Improving Marketing Effectiveness
 1999 – Measuring and valuing customer relationships
 2002 – Getting better value from marketing investments
 2002 – How to Control Marketing – ICAEW Guide
 2005 – Marketing Payback – Is Your Marketing Profitable
 2008 – Return on Ideas: Better Results from Finance and Marketing Working Together

See also 
 Customer relationship management
 Marketing effectiveness
 Marketing ROI
 Demand chain

References 

Living people
1950 births
Writers from Manchester